The Isley Brothers are an American family musical group originally from Cincinnati, Ohio, that began as a vocal trio consisting of brothers O'Kelly "Kelly" Isley Jr., Rudolph Isley and Ronald Isley in the 1950s. With a career spanning over six decades, the group has enjoyed one of the "longest, most influential, and most diverse careers in the pantheon of popular music".

Together with a fourth brother, Vernon, the group performed gospel music until Vernon's death a few years after its formation. After moving to New York City in the late 1950s, the group had their first successes during these early years, and rose to prominence in 1959 with their fourth single, "Shout", written by the three brothers, which became their first single to chart on the Billboard Hot 100, and sold over a million copies. In the 1960s, the group recorded songs for a variety of labels, including the top 20 single "Twist and Shout" and the Motown single "This Old Heart of Mine (Is Weak for You)", before recording and releasing the Grammy Award-winning hit "It's Your Thing" on their own label, T-Neck Records.

The inclusion of younger brothers Ernie Isley (lead guitar, drums) and Marvin Isley (bass guitar), and Rudolph's brother-in-law Chris Jasper (keyboards, synthesizers), in 1973 turned the original vocal trio into a complete band and led to the group’s reaching the height of their success. For the next full decade, they recorded a string of top-selling albums including 3 + 3, Between the Sheets, and The Heat Is On, with the latter peaking at number one on the Billboard 200 chart. The six-member band splintered in 1983, with Ernie, Marvin, and Chris Jasper forming the short-lived spinoff group Isley-Jasper-Isley. The oldest member, O'Kelly, died in 1986. Afterwards Rudolph and Ronald released a pair of albums as a duo before Rudolph retired to a life in the Christian ministry in 1989. After multiple lineup changes, the remaining duo of Ronald and Ernie achieved mainstream success with the albums Mission to Please (1996), Eternal (2001) and Body Kiss (2003). Eternal spawned the top 20 hit "Contagious". , the Isley Brothers continue to perform under the lineup of Ronald and Ernie.

The Isley Brothers have sold over 18 million units in the United States alone. With their first major hit charting in 1959 ("Shout"), and their last one in 2001 ("Contagious"), they are among the few groups ever to have hit the Billboard Hot 100 with new music in six different decades. Sixteen of their albums charted in the Top 40 and thirteen of those albums have been certified gold, platinum or multi-platinum by the RIAA. The brothers have been honored by several musical institutions, including the Rock and Roll Hall of Fame, which inducted them in 1992. Five years later, they were added to Hollywood's Rockwalk, and in 2003 they were inducted to the Vocal Group Hall of Fame. They received the Grammy Lifetime Achievement Award in 2014.

Career

Origins and initial recordings
The Isley Brothers originally came from Cincinnati, Ohio, and were raised in the city's Lincoln Heights suburb, settling in the satellite town of Blue Ash when they were teenagers. Their father, O'Kelly Isley Sr., a former United States Navy sailor and vaudeville performer from Durham, North Carolina, and their mother Sallye, from Georgia, guided the elder four Isley boys in their singing in church. The brothers began performing together in 1954, patterning themselves after groups such as Billy Ward and His Dominoes and The Dixie Hummingbirds. Eventually, they landed a spot on Ted Mack's Amateur Hour, where they won the competition (their prize was a watch). With Vernon singing lead vocals, the quartet soon began touring all over the eastern US, performing in a variety of churches. When Vernon was thirteen, he was killed by a car that struck him as he was riding his bike in his neighborhood. Devastated, the remaining trio disbanded.

Eventually persuaded to regroup, with Ronnie assuming the lead vocal position, the brothers decided to record popular music and left Cincinnati for New York in 1957 with their parents' blessings. The group got in touch with Richard Barrett, who soon had them in contact with a variety of New York record producers. They eventually had their first recorded songs produced by George Goldner, including "Angels Cried" and "The Cow Jumped Over the Moon" for the Teenage, Cindy, and Mark X imprints. The songs were only regional hits, however. By 1959, the group had
landed a recording deal with RCA Records. Later that year, the group recorded their first composition together, "Shout", mixing their brand of gospel vocals and doo-wop harmonies, a song derived from a Washington, D.C., club performance in which the brothers had covered Jackie Wilson's "Lonely Teardrops". The original version of the song peaked at number 47 on the Billboard Hot 100 and never reached the R&B chart. Nevertheless, it sold over one million copies and was awarded a gold disc by the RIAA. Follow-up recordings on RCA failed to chart and the brothers left the label in 1961, and later signed with Scepter Records. In 1962, the Isley Brothers scored their first top 40 hit with the Bert Berns song "Twist and Shout", which reached number 17 on the Hot 100 and number 2 on the R&B chart, staying on the charts for 19 weeks. The song had been produced by Berns for the brothers to teach then-struggling producer Phil Spector how to produce a hit.

Moving their entire operations to New Jersey, the brothers continued to struggle with recordings, and formed T-Neck Records in 1964. During that period, Jimi Hendrix began playing lead guitar for the brothers' band. Bringing Hendrix with them to the studio, they recorded the song "Testify". Later, Hendrix contributed guitar to another Isleys single, "Move On Over and Let Me Dance", which was recorded for T-Neck and distributed by Atlantic Records. After both songs failed to chart and Hendrix left the Isleys for good in 1965, the brothers signed with Motown Records. Early the following year, the group released their second Top 40 hit single, "This Old Heart of Mine (Is Weak for You)". While the Isley Brothers' recordings with Motown were more successful than their earlier works, they struggled to score a follow-up Top 40 hit with the label. They left Motown in 1968.

Major success
Resurrecting their T-Neck label that year, the brothers signed a distribution deal with Buddah Records and issued "It's Your Thing" in February 1969. The song, which featured the first appearance of Ernie Isley on bass, became their biggest success to date, reaching number 2 on the Hot 100 and number 1 on the R&B chart. The song's parent album, It's Our Thing, reached number 22 on the Pop LP chart, and "It's Your Thing" became the group's second million-seller and won them a Grammy Award. The release of "It's Your Thing" brought record label conflicts between the Isleys and Motown, as Motown argued that the group had recorded the song while still under their Motown contract. A 1975 court decision found in the Isleys' favor.

In June 1969, the brothers independently recorded their concert at Yankee Stadium which featured an array of artists. The live album Live at Yankee Stadium was released later that year. They also filmed the concert which was released as a documentary titled It's Your Thing in theaters in August 1970.

By 1971, the younger Isley brothers Ernie and Marvin and their brother-in-law Chris Jasper started to add to the band's music, first performing on the Isleys' Givin' It Back. The album featured reinterpretations of rock songs mixing them with funk and gospel elements. The new members played an even bigger role in the 1972 album, Brother, Brother, Brother. Both albums yielded Top 40 hits, including "Love the One You're With" and "Pop That Thang". By the end of their Buddah tenure in 1973, the brothers had signed a distribution deal with Epic Records and made Ernie, Marvin, and Chris official members. In 1973, the Isleys released 3 + 3, which included the Top 10 hit single "That Lady" and a UK Top 10 cover of "Summer Breeze". Incorporating hard rock and folk-rock as well as funk and soulful balladry, the album became their breakthrough hit, eventually selling over two million copies.

The following year, the album Live It Up also reached platinum. In 1975, the brothers made one of their most successful recordings, The Heat Is On, which featured the hits "Fight the Power" and "For the Love of You", and became their first album to reach number 1 on the Pop LP chart, going double-platinum at two million copies sold. The brothers would have more hit albums, including Harvest for the World (1976), Go for Your Guns (1977), and Showdown (1978), all of which went platinum, and yielded several Top 40 pop and R&B singles and popular radio cuts. By 1979, with the release of Winner Takes All, the brothers had incorporated disco and quiet storm music into their work. The Isley Brothers' final album under their six-member lineup, Between the Sheets (1983), sold more than two million copies. By then, financial struggles, creative difficulties, and other issues affected the group. Shortly after the success of Between the Sheets, Ernie, Marvin, and Chris left the Isley Brothers and formed Isley-Jasper-Isley. They later recorded the hit "Caravan of Love".

Later years

In 1985, the original Isleys trio of O'Kelly, Rudy, and Ronnie signed with Warner Bros. Records and recorded and released the album Masterpiece. Shortly a year after its release, Kelly Isley died from a heart attack while battling cancer, in March 1986. The remaining duo of Ron and Rudy released the Angela Winbush-produced albums, Smooth Sailin' in 1987 and Spend the Night in 1989. Shortly after the latter release, Rudy retired from the music industry and followed life in the ministry. Ron put the group on a brief hiatus in 1990 while he recorded solo material. In 1991, Ron revived the group; Ernie Isley and brother Marvin returned to the fold. that year they released the album, Tracks of Life. Five years later, Ron Isley gained popularity as video villain Frank Biggs (or Mr. Biggs) in the music video for R. Kelly's hit "Down Low (Nobody Has to Know)", which included the Isley Brothers as featured artists. The success of the song and its video helped the brothers' 1996 album Mission to Please reach platinum status.

That same year, Marvin Isley's career ended after a bout with diabetes forced him to have both of his legs amputated. Ron and Ernie have carried on as a duo from then on. In 2001, the duo released their best-selling album in years with the Eternal album, which sold over two million copies and featured the top 20 hit single "Contagious", making the Isley Brothers the only act to reach the Hot 100 (in fact, that chart's top 50) during the 1950s, 1960s, 1970s, 1980s, 1990s, and 2000s. Two years later, the brothers' Body Kiss album peaked at number-one on the Billboard 200 album chart, becoming their second to reach the position and the first to do so since The Heat Is On. Their next two released albums included 2006's Baby Makin' Music and the 2007 holiday album I'll Be Home for Christmas. In 2007, the Isleys' career was interrupted by Ron Isley's three-year prison sentence for tax evasion. He was released in 2010. In June of that year, youngest brother Marvin Isley died in Chicago after his longtime bout with diabetes. During the group's hiatus, Ernie toured as part of the Experience Hendrix concert festival, while Ron Isley released his first solo album, Mr. I, in 2010. A year later, Ron and Ernie reunited and have since performed on the road.

In 1993, The Isley Brothers song "Footsteps in the Dark" was sampled by hip-hop artist Ice Cube for the hit single "It Was a Good Day".

In 1994, The Isley Brothers song "Between the Sheets" was sampled by The Notorious B.I.G. for his hit single "Big Poppa". That same year, R&B singer Aaliyah included a cover version of "(At Your Best) You Are Love" on her debut album. "Luxurious", the fifth single from No Doubt frontwoman Gwen Stefani's 2004 multi-platinum solo debut Love. Angel. Music. Baby. also benefited from a prominent sample of "Between the Sheets".

After the break-up of Isley-Jasper-Isley in 1987, Chris Jasper continued as a solo artist, multi-instrumentalist, and producer, forming his own independent record label, Gold City Records. He has since released 14 solo albums, including 4 gospel albums. He released the #1 R&B hit "Superbad" in 1988, a song which emphasized the importance of education, a theme Jasper continues to emphasize in many of the songs he has written since his days with the Isleys. In January 2013, Jasper released Inspired: By Love, By Life, By the Spirit, a compilation of love songs as well as socially conscious and spiritual tracks. In May 2014, Jasper released The One, reminiscent of the soulful R&B and funk music he wrote for the Isleys. In 2016, Jasper released Share With Me, which included a cover of the Billy Preston hit, "You Are So Beautiful" and a track called "America", a tribute to the nation and a call to come together. In April 2018, Jasper pre-released a double-A single "The Love That You Give/It's a Miracle" from his 15th solo album Dance With You, scheduled for a July 2018 release.

Jasper, who earned a law degree in 2004, has continued to write, record, and perform all the music on his solo albums and produce artists for his Gold City label, including Liz Hogue, Out Front, and Brothaz By Choice. The most recent addition to the Gold City label is Jasper's son, Michael Jasper, a songwriter, recording artist and screenplay writer, who earned his law degree in 2018. In 1989, Chris Jasper wrote, produced and performed on "Make It Last" for Chaka Khan's CK album. In 2015, in conjunction with Sony Music, Jasper released the Essential Chris Jasper which encompasses all of the tracks that Jasper sang lead on during his Isley-Jasper-Isley years and solo career at CBS/Sony Music. In 2015, he received the German Record Critics Lifetime Achievement Award ("Preis der deutschen Schallplattenkritik"). In 2016, Jasper was awarded the National R&B Society Lifetime Achievement Award.

In 2017, Ernie and Ronnie Isley collaborated with guitarist Carlos Santana and released Power of Peace, released on July 28 by Sony Music's Legacy Recordings.

In 2019, Ron and Ernie Isley received the National R&B Music Society's Lifetime Achievement Award and Proclamations from the City of Atlantic City, while on stage in Atlantic City, NJ. In 2021 the brothers participated in a Verzuz with fellow R&B band Earth, Wind & Fire hosted by Steve Harvey, to celebrate both bands contributions to R&B & Pop music and African American culture.

On September 30, 2022, the Isley Brothers released a new album, titled Make Me Say It Again, Girl featuring collaborations with Beyoncé, Earth, Wind & Fire, El DeBarge, and Snoop Dogg.

Musical style and influences

Influenced by gospel and doo-wop, the group experimented with different musical styles over the course of their career. According to AllMusic, "the group's distinguished history spanned not only two generations of Isley siblings but also massive cultural shifts, which heralded their music's transformation from gritty R&B to Motown soul to blistering funk". According to the Chicago Reader's Frank Youngwerth, "While steps they took to survive on the developing pop scene of the 60s at times threatened to tie them to a manufactured sound and image, particularly during a stint on Motown, their break with that label in 1968 signaled the scrappy vocal trio’s rebirth as a self-reliant progressive soul band." According to Chicago Reader writer James Porter, "one side of the Isley Brothers’ career during this era consistently gets swept under the rug: their status as a hard-rock band"; Rock elements were present in the band's music as early as 1964, when Jimi Hendrix played guitar for the band, but after Ernie Isley joined in 1973, Ernie's "atomic solos gave their music extra rock power". Porter said that songs like "That Lady" and "Live It Up" were meant to "give Led Zeppelin and the other big guns of rock some competition" and that "In the 1970s, the Isley Brothers made heavy metal you could dance to."

Awards and nominations 
The Isley Brothers were inducted the Rock and Roll Hall of Fame in 1992. In 1997, they were inducted into Hollywood's Rockwalk, and in 2003 they were inducted to the Vocal Group Hall of Fame.

Grammy Awards
The Isley Brothers have won two Grammy Awards, including the Grammy Lifetime Achievement Award. Two of their songs are inducted into the Grammy Hall of Fame.
|-
| 1970
| "It's Your Thing"
| Best R&B Vocal Performance by a Duo or Group
| 
|-
|2002
| "Contagious"
| Best R&B Performance by a Duo or Group with Vocal
| 
|-
|2004
| "Busted"
| Best R&B Performance by a Duo or Group with Vocal
| 
|-
| 2004
| Body Kiss
| Best R&B Album
| 
|-
|2014
| Isley Brothers
| Grammy Lifetime Achievement Award
|

Grammy Hall of Fame

|-
|1999
| "Shout"
| Hall of Fame (Single)
| 
|-
|2010
| "Twist and Shout"
| Hall of Fame (Single)
|

Members
 Current members
 Ronald Isley – lead vocals (1955–present), backing vocals (1954–1955)
 Ernie Isley – guitars, bass, drums, percussion (1969–1984, 1991–present)
 Former members
 Vernon Isley – lead vocals (1954–1955; his death)
 Rudolph Isley – backing vocals (1954–1989, 2004)
 O'Kelly Isley Jr. – backing vocals (1954–1986; his death)
 Marvin Isley – bass (1969–1970, 1971–1984, 1991–1997; died 2010)
 Chris Jasper – keyboards, backing vocals, conducted string arrangements, guitars , bass , percussion (1969, 1971–1984)

Timeline

Discography

Studio albums
 Shout! (1959)
 Twist & Shout (1962)
 Twisting and Shouting (1963)
 This Old Heart of Mine (1966)
 Soul on the Rocks (1967)
 It's Our Thing (1969)
 The Brothers: Isley (1969)
 Get into Something (1970)
 Givin' It Back (1971)
 Brother, Brother, Brother (1972)
 3 + 3 (1973)
 Live It Up (1974)
 The Heat Is On (1975)
 Harvest for the World (1976)
 Go for Your Guns (1977)
 Showdown (1978)
 Winner Takes All (1979)
 Go All the Way (1980)
 Grand Slam (1981)
 Inside You (1981)
 The Real Deal (1982)
 Between the Sheets (1983)
 Masterpiece (1985)
 Smooth Sailin' (1987)
 Spend the Night (1989)
 Tracks of Life (1992)
 Mission to Please (1996)
 Eternal (2001)
 Body Kiss (2003)
 Baby Makin' Music (2006)
 Power of Peace (2017)
 Make Me Say It Again, Girl (2022)

References

External links

 
  / VEVO
 
 The Isley Brothers at the Vocal Group Hall of Fame
 
 Official Website of Chris Jasper
 Gold City Records

 
African-American rock musical groups
American funk musical groups
American soul musical groups
Atlantic Records artists
Blue Ash, Ohio
Def Jam Recordings artists
Epic Records artists
Family musical groups
Grammy Lifetime Achievement Award winners
Motown artists
Musical groups established in 1954
Musical groups from Cincinnati
Musical groups from New Jersey
Musicians from Cincinnati
Northern soul musicians
People from Englewood, New Jersey
People from Lincoln Heights, Ohio
RCA Victor artists
Rock music groups from Ohio
Scepter Records artists
Wand Records artists
Warner Records artists
1954 establishments in Ohio